Paw Paw Township is one of nineteen townships in DeKalb County, Illinois, USA. As of the 2010 census, its population was 334 and it contained 137 housing units.

Geography

Unincorporated towns
 Rollo at

Cemeteries
 East Paw Paw
 Old Stevens

Demographics

School districts
 Earlville Community Unit School District 9
 Indian Creek Community Unit District 425
 Lee Center Community Unit School District 271
 Leland Community Unit School District 1

Political districts
 Illinois's 14th congressional district
 State House District 70
 State Senate District 35

References
 
 US Census Bureau 2009 TIGER/Line Shapefiles
 US National Atlas

External links
 City-Data.com
 Illinois State Archives
 Township Officials of Illinois
 DeKalb County Official Site

Townships in DeKalb County, Illinois
1850 establishments in Illinois
Townships in Illinois